Agnibesa plumbeolineata is a moth in the family Geometridae first described by George Hampson in 1895. It is found in Sikkim in India and in China.

References

Moths described in 1895
Asthenini
Moths of Asia